Ngọc Hà is a ward of Ba Đình, Hanoi. Historically, Ngọc Hà was a village forming part of Thăng Long, and was famous for flower cultivation.

References

External links 

Geography of Hanoi
Communes of Hanoi
Populated places in Hanoi